A Crisis Intervention Team (CIT) is a police mental health collaborative program found in North America. The term "CIT" is often used to describe both a program and a training in law enforcement to help guide interactions between law enforcement and those living with a mental illness.

The National Alliance on Mental Illness (NAMI) Crisis Intervention Team (CIT) programs are local initiatives designed to improve the way law enforcement and the community respond to people experiencing mental health crisis. CIT programs are built on strong partnerships between law enforcement, mental health provider agencies, and individuals and families affected by mental illness."

History 
Mental health contacts and intervention by law enforcement became part of the profession with the deinstitutionalization of nonviolent mentally ill patients in the 1960s. The goal was to allow people receiving treatment in an institution to continue to receive the treatment but from community service agencies. The money saved by hospital closing was to be transferred to outpatient community programs.

The money intended for outpatient services never found its way to the community. Funding for outpatient treatment services and programs are still lacking in most areas of the United States. This left a gap for people who were in need of services. Without the assistance many people stop their treatment programs; which resulted in many people becoming unstable while living in the community, with their families who were ill-equipped to be caregivers.

When people living with the illness became psychotic or had poor quality of life in communities, the police became the go to resource for helping. Law enforcement has always been there to serve the most vulnerable in their community, which historically was viewed as victims of crime. With the lack of resources and treatment for people with mental illness they became the most vulnerable in many communities leading officers to become front line mental health workers.

In September 1987, Memphis, TN, police responded to a 911 call involving a man with a history of mental illness who was cutting himself with a knife and threatening suicide. When officers responded to the location they ordered the man to drop the knife. The man became more upset and ran toward the officers with the knife still in his hand. Officers then discharged their firearms killing the man.

Officers were trained to use deadly force when they perceive their own or someone else's life to be in grave danger. This incident was criticized because the perception on the call was the only life in danger was the man who wanted to kill himself. This occurred during a time of racial tension in Memphis and the man was African-American while both officers were white. This incident was the catalyst for the creation of the Crisis Intervention Team (CIT) in Memphis.

The Memphis Police Department joined in partnership with the Memphis Chapter of the National Alliance on Mental Illness (NAMI), mental health providers, and two universities (University of Memphis and University of Tennessee) in organizing, training, and implementing a specialized unit. This new alliance was established to develop a more intelligent, understandable, and safe approach to mental health crisis events. The community effort was the genesis of the Memphis Police Department's Crisis Intervention Team.

The Memphis CIT program has achieved remarkable success, in large part because it has remained a true community partnership. Today, the so-called "Memphis Model" has been adopted by more than 2,700 communities in the U.S. including other countries.

Core elements 

The University of Memphis School of Urban Affairs and Public Policy Department of Criminology and Criminal Justice CIT Center released a paper outlining central components of CIT in 2007. The elements of CIT programs identified are:

Ongoing Elements

 Partnerships: Law Enforcement, Advocacy, Mental Health
 Community Ownership: Planning, Implementation & Networking
 Policies and Procedures

Operational Elements

 CIT: Officer, Dispatcher, Coordinator
 Curriculum: CIT Training
 Mental Health Receiving Facility: Emergency Services

Sustaining Elements

 Evaluation and Research
 In-Service Training
 Recognition and Honors

Implementations

United States

Oregon 

In the state of Oregon, CIT programs were implemented after the death of James Chasse, who was beaten and repeatedly tased by three Portland police officers in 2006. Chasse, who had schizophrenia, sustained 16 broken ribs, a broken shoulder and sternum, and major internal injuries. He was taken to the city jail, where the medical staff refused to admit him and ordered that he be taken to a hospital. But he died en route. The three officers were never indicted for their part in his death. Medics later testified that his broken ribs were most likely due to the emergency trauma care (CPR) he received.

Chasse's death prompted an outcry in the news media, in response to which Portland mayor Tom Potter instituted a CIT program. Other cities and counties in Oregon followed suit.

Texas 

Starting in late 2011, a group of Texas CIT officers met in Austin, Texas, to lay the foundation for Texas' first CIT Officer's Association. The association's goal is to promote mental health education as it pertains to law enforcement's interaction and care for the mentally ill. The association will also host an annual conference where stakeholders can discuss new options for better practices in the field. The Association launched its website in 2012.

New Mexico 
In Albuquerque, NM, the police department began a Crisis Intervention Team program in 1996 after 6 people were killed in crisis related police shootings between 1994 and 1995. The increase was associated with victim participant homicides or suicide by cop. Sergeant William Pettit went to the Memphis Police Department to understand a Crisis Intervention Team model in 1988. Sgt. Pettit was instructed about the Memphis program and implemented elements in order to create a CIT program within the Albuquerque Police Department.

Albuquerque was hit again with community tragedies involving law enforcement interaction with people living with a mental illness that sparked an investigation by the Department of Justice (DOJ) in 2014. The community voiced their concerns and the investigation by the DOJ also noted, "fatal confrontations with individuals experiencing mental health crises continue to cause significant public concern over the department's ability and willingness to consider the safety and well-being of the individuals in distress." The finding letter also stated, "A significant amount of the force we reviewed was used against persons with mental illness and in crisis." During this investigation the shooting of James Boyd occurred.

The findings letter and outcry from the community ended in a court appointed settlement agreement with the Department of Justice. The settlement agreement determined that all officers will be trained in CIT and that 40% of field officer would receive additional specialized training in interactions with people experiencing crisis. The agreement also stated that the department's full time crisis intervention unit be staffed with 12 full time detectives.

Canada 

Some cities in Canada have implemented Crisis Intervention Teams based on three models. The Mobile Crisis Intervention Team (MCIT) model pairs a police officer with a nurse and responds to calls after first-responders have rendered or as first-responders render the scene safe. The Mobile Crisis Rapid Response Team (RRT) model responds directly to calls relating to people in crisis. The Crisis Outreach and Support Team (COAST) model sends teams by appointment through a hotline and often provides social services. Cities in Canada vary on which models they choose to implement.

Toronto 
The Toronto Police Service MCIT has existed since the year 2000. However, the MCIT unit received significant attention after the shooting death of immigrant, Sammy Yatim, when a Toronto police officer intervened aggressively against Yatim who was holding a knife aboard a streetcar. The expansion of the MCIT unit was recommended in a subsequent coroner's inquest into police shootings of suspects with edged weapons. Toronto Police MCIT teams are composed of mental health nurses from various local hospitals paired with a police officer. The team responds to calls as secondary responders.

Hamilton 
The Hamilton Police Service is the first police service in Canada to implement all three models of crisis intervention programs. The Crisis Response Unit implements the MCIT and MCRRT models as the Mobile Rapid Response Team, while the COAST model is implemented by the COAST and Social Navigator teams. It is claimed that following the implementation of the COAST program, arrest rates for persons in crisis fell from 66% to 25% and on average, police officers saved 580 hours per year.

Vancouver 
The Vancouver Police Department has implemented the MCIT model using Car 87 since 1978. The COAST model is implemented through both the Assertive Community Treatment Team (ACT) and the Assertive Outreach Team (AOT). The ACT is composed primarily of mental health professionals, and provides social services for patients with high-risk or long-term mental health issues. The AOT provides support to patients with mental health issues as they leave detention in hospital or jail.

References

Further reading

External links 
What is CIT? by the National Alliance on Mental Illness
University of Memphis CIT Center, a resource website
Crisis Intervention Team International, a non-profit professional association based in Memphis, Tennessee
Crisis Intervention Team, Inc., a nonprofit in Albuquerque, New Mexico which advocates for the Crisis Intervention Team model and provides training materials
NAMI San Antonio CIT web page
Commission on Peace Officer Standards and Training (California) CIT web page

Law enforcement in the United States
Mental health in the United States